Kit Carson County is a county located in the U.S. state of Colorado. As of the 2020 census, the population was 7,087. The county seat is Burlington. The county was established in 1889 and named for American frontiersman and Indian fighter Kit Carson.

Geography

Adjacent counties
Yuma County (north)
Cheyenne County, Kansas (northeast/Central Time border)
Sherman County, Kansas (east)
Wallace County, Kansas (southeast)
Cheyenne County (south)
Lincoln County (west)
Washington County (northwest)

Major highways
  Interstate 70

  U.S. Highway 24
  U.S. Highway 385
  State Highway 59

Demographics

At the 2000 census there were 8,011 people, 2,990 households, and 2,081 families living in the county.  The population density was 4 people per square mile (1/km2).  There were 3,430 housing units at an average density of 2 per square mile (1/km2).  The racial makeup of the county was 87.28% White, 1.74% Black or African American, 0.51% Native American, 0.32% Asian, 0.04% Pacific Islander, 9.20% from other races, and 0.91% from two or more races.  13.67% of the population were Hispanic or Latino of any race.
Of the 2,990 households 33.60% had children under the age of 18 living with them, 59.40% were married couples living together, 6.30% had a female householder with no husband present, and 30.40% were non-families. 27.20% of households were one person and 12.50% were one person aged 65 or older.  The average household size was 2.50 and the average family size was 3.07.

The age distribution was 26.70% under the age of 18, 7.50% from 18 to 24, 29.00% from 25 to 44, 22.20% from 45 to 64, and 14.60% 65 or older.  The median age was 37 years. For every 100 females there were 112.20 males.  For every 100 females age 18 and over, there were 112.10 males.

The median household income was $33,152 and the median family income was $41,867. Males had a median income of $28,700 versus $19,978 for females. The per capita income for the county was $16,964.  About 9.40% of families and 12.10% of the population were below the poverty line, including 16.60% of those under age 18 and 11.10% of those age 65 or over.

Politics
Like all the High Plains, Kit Carson County is powerfully Republican. Since 1920 it has been won only twice by a Democratic presidential candidate – during the landslides of 1932 and 1964. Along with Elbert County and Rio Blanco County, it was one of three Colorado counties to be won by Alf Landon in 1936.

In other statewide elections, Kit Carson County also leans strongly Republican: no Democratic senatorial candidate has won the county since before 1990. At a gubernatorial level, it has been won by Democrat Roy Romer in 1990 – when he carried all but four counties statewide – and by Constitution Party candidate Tom Tancredo in 2010.

Recreation

National historic landmark
Philadelphia Toboggan Company Carousel #6, National Historic Landmark

Historic trail
Smoky Hill Trail

Communities

City
Burlington

Towns
Bethune
Flagler
Seibert
Stratton
Vona

See also

Outline of Colorado
Index of Colorado-related articles
National Register of Historic Places listings in Kit Carson County, Colorado

Notes

References

External links

Colorado County Evolution by Don Stanwyck
Colorado Historical Society

 

 
Colorado counties
1889 establishments in Colorado
Eastern Plains
Populated places established in 1889